Year 1318 (MCCCXVIII) was a common year starting on Sunday (link will display the full calendar) of the Julian calendar.

Events 
 By place 

 Europe 
 Spring – King Birger Magnusson is deposed (after a 27-year reign) by his brother's supporters and goes into exile to Denmark under his brother-in-law, King Eric VI, taking the Swedish Royal Archives with him.
 April – The inhabitants of Benevento rise against Pope John XXII and demand some political autonomy. Finally, the rebellion is crushed by papal forces. 
 June 27 – Mats Kettilmundsson, Swedish knight and statesman, is appointed as regent (rikshövitsman) of Sweden, in the absence of a Swedish king.
 July 19 – Duke Leopold I (the Glorious), co-ruler of Austria and Styria, makes peace with the Forest Cantons (or Waldstätte), in Central Switzerland.
 Summer – Thomas I (Komnenos Doukas), last male-line descendant of Michael I (Angelos), is assassinated by his nephew Nicholas Orsini at Arta.
 September 22 – Otto the Mild, becomes ruler over the Duchy of Brunswick-Lüneburg in Lower Saxony, after the death of his father Albert II (the Fat).
 November 22 – Grand Prince Mikhail of Tver is summoned by Özbeg Khan at Sarai, the capital of the Golden Horde. After his arrival, he is executed. 

 England 
 April 1–2 – Scottish forces under James Douglas (the Black) retake Berwick-upon-Tweed. The fall of Berwick is a severe blow for King Edward II, and its loss is compounded by the fall of the Northumbrian castles of Wark-on-Tweed (or Carham Castle), Harbottle and Mitford.
 May – Scottish forces under King Robert I (the Bruce) raid Yorkshire and burn Northallerton, Boroughbridge and Knaresborough (where some 140 houses are destroyed). They also terrorize the citizens of Ripon, who are spared destruction, on payment of 1,000 marks.
 May 10 – Battle of Dysert O'Dea: An Irish confederation defeats the Hiberno-Normans under Richard de Clare. During the battle, some 500 men are killed, along with 80 English nobles.
 August 9 – Treaty of Leake: Edward II signs an agreement with the "Middle Party" led by his cousin, Earl Thomas of Lancaster, and his court followers at East Leake in Nottinghamshire. 
 October 14 – Battle of Faughart: A Hiberno-Norman force defeats a Scots-Irish army commanded by Edward Bruce (who is killed in the battle), ending the Bruce campaign in Ireland.

 Asia 
 March 29 – Emperor Hanazono abdicates the throne after a 9-year reign. He is succeeded by his cousin, Go-Daigo, as the 96th emperor of Japan (until 1339).

 By topic  

 Religion 
 Pope John XXII persecutes the Spiritual Franciscans (Fraticelli), an Italian branch of the order that pursues strictly the Franciscan ideal of Apostolic poverty; four members are burned at the stake as heretics. 
 John XXII creates ten suffragan bishoprics for Persia; Armenia, Persia and India are granted to the Dominicans as a mission field, while the Franciscans get China (approximate date).

Births 
 June 18 – Eleanor of Woodstock, English princess and regent (d. 1355)
 June 29 – Yusuf I (al-Muyyad billah), Nasrid ruler of Granada (d. 1354)
 September 11 – Eleanor of Lancaster, English noblewoman (d. 1372)
 date unknown
 Albert II, German nobleman (House of Mecklenburg) (d. 1379)
 Anne of Austria, German princess (House of Habsburg) (d. 1343)
 Baha' al-Din Naqshband, Persian Sufi religious leader (d. 1389)
 Bogislaw V (the Great), German nobleman and knight (d. 1374)
 Contance of Aragon, Spanish noblewoman and queen (d. 1346)
 David de la Hay, Scottish nobleman and High Constable (d. 1346)
 Kitabatake Akiie, Japanese nobleman (Minamoto clan) (d. 1338)
 Margaret Audley, English noblewoman and landowner (d. 1349)
 Margaret of Tyrol, Austrian princess (House of Gorizia) (d. 1369)
 Maurice FitzGerald, Irish nobleman and Lord Justice (d. 1390)
 Wenceslaus I, Polish nobleman, knight and co-ruler (d. 1364)

Deaths 
 January 17 – Erwin von Steinbach, German architect (b. 1244)
 February 14 
 Henry I (Lackland), German nobleman and ruler (b. 1256)
 Margaret of France, queen consort of England (b. 1279)
 March 11 – Amanieu II, French nobleman and archbishop (b. 1232)
 April 26 – Matilda of Brunswick-Lüneburg, German co-ruler (b. 1276)
 May 10 – Richard de Clare, English nobleman, knight and steward
 May 26 – Fujiwara no Kishi, Japanese empress consort (b. 1252)
 June 23 – Gilles I Aycelin de Montaigu, French counselor (b. 1252)
 July 25 – Nicholas I, Bohemian nobleman, knight and ruler (b. 1255)
 August 14 – Giacomo Colonna, Italian priest and cardinal (b. 1250)
 August 20 – Cassone della Torre, Italian nobleman and patriarch
 September 22 – Albert II (the Fat), German nobleman (b. 1268)
 October 14 – (Battle of Faughart)
 Edward Bruce, Scottish nobleman and High King 
 Philip Mowbray, Scottish nobleman and governor
 November 22 – Mikhail of Tver, Kievan Grand Prince (b. 1271)
 November 25 – Philip of Ibelin, Outremer nobleman and knight
 November 29 – Heinrich Frauenlob, German musician and poet
 December 16 – Dirk II van Brederode, Dutch nobleman (b. 1256)
 December 19 – Husseini Heravi, Persian poet and writer (b. 1245)
 date unknown
 Abdisho bar Berika (or St. Odisho), Syrian bishop and writer
 Eric Magnusson, Swedish prince and knight (House of Bjelbo)
 Gilbert Middleton, English nobleman, knight and rebel leader
 Henry of Hachberg-Sausenberg, German nobleman (b. 1300)
 Jamal al-Din al-Watwat, Egyptian scholar and writer (b. 1235)
 Jean IV de Beaumont, French nobleman, knight and marshal
 John II (Doukas), Byzantine nobleman and ruler (sebastokrator)
 John de Soules, Scoto-Norman landowner (House of de Soules)
 Konoe Tsunehira, Japanese nobleman (Fujiwara clan) (b. 1287)
 Rashid-al-Din Hamadani, Persian historian and writer (b. 1247)
 Thomas I (Komnenos Doukas), Byzantine nobleman (b. 1288)
 Valdemar Magnusson, Swedish nobleman and prince (b. 1283)

References